Claraville Station is a pastoral lease that currently operates as a cattle station in Queensland.

The property is composed of open forest country with softer area of frontage country along the Clara and Yappar Rivers and their tributaries. There are good stands of Mitchell Grass, Spearwood and Spinifex throughout along with edible shrubs such as verano and stylos.

The channel systems support areas of Coolibah, Gum and Box Trees that extend into Wattle. The property is divided into 10 main paddocks, 6 smaller paddocks and numerous holding paddocks. The main house at the homestead was built in 2005.

Clareville was established at some time prior to 1884 when it was acquired the Rochfort brothers who also owned Dotswood and Wallabadah Stations.

Jack Campbell and John Thomas Willcox owned the property in 1925 with Campbell managing the station.

The Priestley brothers owned the station in 1952 which had been a dry season and the herd had been reduced to 2,000 head, 1,000 of which were transferred to WondoolaStation.

In 2013 the property was placed on the market Sydney-based owners Mike and Kim Sergeant.

See also
List of ranches and stations

References

Stations (Australian agriculture)
Pastoral leases in Queensland
North West Queensland